Missing Johnny is a 2017 Taiwanese drama film written and directed by Huang Xi. The film stars Lawrence Ko, Rima Zeidan and Sean Huang. Missing Johnny is Huang's debut feature. It is executive produced by Hou Hsiao-hsien.

Premise
Hsu, a young woman who raises parrots and other feathered creatures in her apartment, keeps getting wrong phone calls for someone named Johnny. Lee, the autistic son of Hsu's landlady, seems to live in his own world. Chang is a shy handyman who feels disoriented whenever his beloved car breaks down. The lives of these three lonely individuals are drawn together when one of Hsu's parrots goes missing one day.

Cast
 Lawrence Ko as Chang Yi-feng
 Rima Zeidan as Hsu Zi-qi 
 Sean Huang as Lee Li 
 Chang Kuo-chu as Chi-yuan
 Kay Huang as Mrs. Lee
 Duan Chun-hao as Hao 
 Tang Zhi-ping as Zhi-wei 
 Hsueh Ti-ying as Hsueh 
 Pao Chen-fang 
 Jack Kao

Awards and nominations

References

External links

2017 films
Taiwanese drama films
2017 drama films
2017 directorial debut films
2010s Mandarin-language films